The CP Urban Services network is the commuter train network of Metropolitan Lisbon and Metropolitan Porto, Portugal. It is a Comboios de Portugal company. It connects the city centers with the suburbs.

Metropolitan Lisbon Network

The system is complemented in Lisbon by the Lisbon Metro and an extensive bus network.

It comprises four lines which served 103 million passengers in 2019.

 Azambuja line: connects Azambuja and Castanheira do Ribatejo to Alcântara-Terra and Santa Apolónia
 Cascais line: connects Cascais to Cais do Sodré
 Sado line: connects Barreiro to Praias do Sado
 Sintra line: connects Sintra and Mira-Sintra-Meleças to Rossio, Alverca and Oriente

Although the Cintura line connects the Azambuja line (at Braço de Prata) to the Cascais line (at Alcântara-Mar), the stretch between Alcântara-Terra and Alcântara-Mar is only used for freight services, and passengers transferring between both stations have to do so on foot.

Nowadays, the services from the Azambuja and Sintra lines are joined in a single timetable, as "Azambuja/Lisboa/Sintra".

Since 2011, the Azambuja line has offered a direct connection between Azambuja and Alcântara-Terra, with an additional Castanheira–Santa Apolónia service during weekdays, a change that will be reversed with the Summer 2015 timetables, that reintroduce the older Azambuja–Santa Apolónia and Castanheira–Alcântara-Terra services.

Metropolitan Porto network

The CP Urban Services in the great Porto area consists of 4 main lines, linking Porto Terminus São Bento Station (Estação de São Bento) in Porto Downtown with the cities of Braga, Guimarães, Aveiro and Penafiel. The lines are completely electrified and the service is efficient, serving over 24 million passengers in 2019.

The Commuter rail service in Porto is well connected with bus and metro service in the city, linking with lines A (Blue line), B (Red line), C (Green line), E (Violet Line) and F (Orange Line) of metro service in Campanhã Station and with line D (Yellow line) in São Bento Station.

A fifth line was inaugurated in September 2009, Leixões line, connecting Porto to Leixões. This line closed again in 2011.

In 2018, a study was launched into a new 36.5 km rail line branching from Valongo on the Linha de Caide to Felgueiras, with an expectedly cost of €300 million.

Metropolitan Coimbra network

Since the closure by Comboios de Portugal of the lines from Coimbra to Lousã – Miranda do Corvo (Ramal da Lousã), in 2004, and Coimbra to Figueira da Foz via Cantanhede (Ramal da Figueira da Foz) in 2011, the Urbanos Coimbra service now only consists of the Baixo Mondego corridor, from Coimbra to Figueira da Foz via Montemor-o-Velho (Ramal de Alfarelos of the Linha do Norte, Linha do Oeste and Ramal da Lousã).

See also
List of rapid transit systems
List of suburban and commuter rail systems
Lisbon Metro
Porto Metro

References

External links
Official Web Site (in English)

Comboios de Portugal
Public transport in Portugal
Transport in Lisbon